Costas Now was an American monthly sports television show hosted by Bob Costas on HBO.

History
In 2001, Costas was hired by HBO to host a 12-week talk and interview series called On the Record with Bob Costas. In 2005, the program was revamped to become Costas Now, with more of a focus on sports and a year-round schedule in a 9 p.m. ET time slot. Costas Now was similar to another HBO sports show hosted by Bryant Gumbel called Real Sports with Bryant Gumbel.

In February 2009, Costas left HBO to sign with MLB Network, effectively ending Costas Now. HBO replaced it with a similar, short-lived program called Joe Buck Live, hosted by Fox Sports broadcaster Joe Buck.

See also
 Later with Bob Costas
 Football Night in America
 Costas on the Radio

External links
 
 HBO Archives: Sports Journalism - On the Record with Bob Costas & CostasNow

HBO Sports
2005 American television series debuts
2009 American television series endings
2000s American television news shows
HBO original programming
American sports television series
English-language television shows
HBO Shows (series) WITHOUT Episode info, list, or Article